Saint Gerard or Gérard may refer to:

People
Gérard of Brogne (c. 895–959), abbot in Belgium
Gerard of Toul (935–994), bishop of Toul, now in France
Gerard of Csanád (980–1046), bishop of Csanád
Gerard of Potenza (died 1118), bishop of Potenza in Italy
Gerard of Clairvaux (died 1138), French monk
Gerard of Lunel (1275–1298), French saint
Gerard Majella (1726–1755), Italian saint

Other
St. Gerard Majella Annual Novena, Dundalk, Ireland
Saint-Gérard, Belgium, a village in Wallonia

See also
Blessed Gerard (c. 1040–1120), Benedictine and founder of the Order of St John of Jerusalem